Sheila Walsh (born 5 July 1956) is a Scottish-born American contemporary Christian vocalist, songwriter, evangelist, author, inspirational speaker, and talk-show host.

Life and career
Born in Ayr, Scotland, Walsh began her career as a contemporary Christian singer after finishing college with studies in theology from London Bible College (now London School of Theology) in 1979 and music from the London Academy of Operatic Art. Walsh worked as an evangelist with the British chapter of Youth For Christ and sang with a group known as "The Oasis" until going solo in 1981. She also worked closely at this time with keyboard player Chris Rolinson, who contributed extensively to the unique sound on her first "new wave" style album, Future Eyes.  He also toured with her on her first United States tour, where she opened for Phil Keaggy. As Walsh enjoyed some success both in the United Kingdom and America as a CCM musician, she was asked by minister Pat Robertson to serve as a co-host of his television talk-show, The 700 Club in 1987. Walsh served in this capacity into 1992 and also hosted her own talk-show, Heart to Heart with Sheila Walsh.

Ideological differences with Pat Robertson and general feelings of depression brought Walsh to re-examine her life's direction. After leaving Pat Robertson's enterprises in 1992 she sought therapy for her depression, eventually returning to college at Fuller Theological Seminary in California to take on doctoral studies in theology. Pat Robertson explained her departure from CBN as the result of a "nervous breakdown" brought on by the tremendous demands of her work with CBN. He asked his viewers to keep her in their prayers and ask God to give her the strength to continue doing His work.

She went on to write a book exploring her struggle with depression and her experiences with her faith as a Christian, entitled Honestly. While Walsh had written several books on theology before, this autobiography would become the wellspring of her later work on personal aspects of faith and would set the tone for her introspective, personal, but evangelical approach to affairs of modern theology.

Over the course of the latter 1990s, Walsh's work has concerned women's issues within the church and the unique relationship of the contemporary woman with God. She has written over seventeen books including Honestly, Living Fearlessly, and Life is Tough, but God is Faithful. She has also written several books for children recently. She also has continued her musical career as a songwriter and singer and has recorded several albums of new Christian music and traditional hymns arranged to a Celtic sound.

In 2005, Walsh partnered with Tommy Nelson publishers to create the Gigi, God's Little Princess line of children's books and DVDs.

Walsh, with her family, is now an active attendee of Prestonwood Baptist Church, in Plano, Texas.

As of 2007, Walsh has appeared on many TV programs such as: Life Today, Hour of Power and The Rock Gospel Show (BBC) among many others. She was a member of the team "Women of Faith" on the second season of The American Bible Challenge on GSN.

Discography

Albums
 Future Eyes (1981)
 No One Loves Me Like You (1982)
 War of Love (1983) released in the UK as Drifting with slightly different track listing
 Triumph in the Air (1984)
 Don't Hide Your Heart (1985)
 Portrait (Compilation album) (1986) reissued in 1988 on CD as Compact Favorites 
 Shadowlands (1986)
 Say So (1988)
 Simple Truth (1989)
 Hymns and Voices (1990) reissued in 2002, with bonus tracks, as The Hymns Collection
 For a Time Like This (1991)
 Hope (1998)
 Blue Waters (2000)
 Peace: A Celtic Christmas (2000)
 Love Falls Down (2001)
 All That Really Matters (2003)
 Celtic Lullabies and Gentle Worship (2003)
 The Best of Sheila Walsh (compilation album) (2004)
 You Raise Me Up (2005)
 Celtic Worship (2006)
 Find Your Wings (2007)
 Heart Wide Open (2008)
 Let Go (2009)
 God's Little Princess Lullabies (2009)
 I Hear Angels (2010)
 Beauty From Ashes (2012)
 Braveheart Worship (2020)

Singles
"Here With Me"/"Burn On" (1980)
"Drifting" (duet with Cliff Richard) - UK No. 64/"Lonely When the Lights Go On" (1983)
"Turn, Turn, Turn"/"Sleepwalking" (1983)
"Growing Up to Be a Child"/"Private Life" (1984)
"His Eyes"/"He Moved a Mountain" (1984)
"Surrendering"/"Don't Turn Your Back On Jesus" (1984)
"Jesus Call Your Lambs" (duet with Cliff Richard)/"We're All One" (1985)
"Christian"/"Sand in the Hand" (1986)
"What Do You Know (That I Don't)"/"Never Give It Up" (1986)
"I Hope and I Pray"/"Speak of Love" (both duets with Alvin Stardust) (1986)
"Trapeze"/"Surrender" (1988)
"Angles With Dirty Faces"/"Hope for the Hopeless" (1988)
"I Will Run to You" (2001)
"Time For You to Fly" (2001)
"Beneath the Waters I Will Rise" (2012)

Compilation albums
I Hope and I Pray Single (I Hope and I Pray & Speak of Love duets with Alvin Stardust) 1983
Sparrow Spotlight Sampler Various Artists (Mystery) 1983
Look Who Loves You Now Michele Pillar (duet on To Worship You) 1984
Do Something Now The CAUSE Various Artists 1985
Fight The Fight: Rescue The Unborn Various Artists 1985
Limelight Steve Taylor (duet on Not Gonna Fall Away) 1986
Transatlantic Remixes Steve Taylor & Sheila Walsh (Not Gonna Fall Away duet with Steve Taylor & We're All One) 1986
Sounds of the Summer Vol. 1 Various Artists (We're All One Extended Remix Version) 1986
Take 'Em With You 3 Various Artists (Big Boy Now) 1986
Wired for Sound Various Artists (Big Boy Now) 1987
Shake: Christian Artists Face The Music (Interview & tracks from the album "Say So") 1988
Soaring Volume II
Adventures in the Land of Big Beats & Happy Feets Various Artists (Ship of Love Remixed) 1989
25 Songs of Christmas Various Artists (Star Song) 1989
25 Songs of Christmas Volume 2 Various Artists (Season to Rejoice) 1989
The Myrrh Radio Collection Volume 3 Various Artists (God Loves You) 1989
Handel's Young Messiah Various Artists (duet with Russ Taff on He Shall Feed His Flock) 1990
Micah's Christmas Treasure (The Treasure Is Mine) (No Soundtrack available) 1994
26 All Time Classic Hymns Various Artists (How Great Thou Art) 1996
Women of Faith Joy Various Artists (Saviour Like a Shepherd) 1998
Women of Faith Overwhelming Joy Various Artists (Hope) 1999
Women of Faith Outrageous Joy Women of Faith Worship Team (Intro for & song Savior Of My Heart Live) 1998
Women of Faith Extravagant Grace Women of Faith Worship Team (O the Passion) 2000
Covenant Christmas Praise Various Artists (O Come, O Come Emmanuel) 2002
Living Waters: Haven Various Artists (After All) 2002
Living Waters: Solitude Various Artists (Throne Of Grace) 2002
Women of Faith The Artist Collection Various Artists (You Are Beautiful) 2003
For Such A Time As This Various Artists (The Blessings Flow) 2005
Platinum Series: The Best of Celtic Worship Various Artists (O the Passion) 2006
Created to Worship Live @ Malone University Circle of Friends (Let Go Radio Special) 2010
Women of Faith Hope and Grace Various Artists (Amazing Grace) 2010
The Best Celtic Worship Album In The World...Ever! Various Artists (You Raise Me Up) 2012

Publications
 God Put a Fighter In Me (1985) - re-published as  Never Give It Up (1986)
 Holding on to Heaven With Hell on Your Back (1990)
 Sparks In the Dark (1993) Devotional
 Honestly (1996)
 Gifts for Your Soul (1997) Devotional
 Bring Back The Joy (1998)
 Faith Hope Love (1998) Gift Book
 Life Is Tough But God Is Faithful (1999)
 Stones From the River of Mercy (2000)
 Stories From the River of Mercy (2000) - re-published as Unexpected Grace (2002)
 Living Fearlessly (2001)
 The Best Devotions by Sheila Walsh (2001)
 A Love So Big (2002)
 All That Really Matters (2003)
 The Heartache No One Sees (2004)
 Outrageous Love (2004) Gift Book
 Extraordinary Faith (2005)
 Come As You Are (2005) Gift Book
 I'm Not Wonder Woman, But God Made Me Wonderful (2006)
 God Has a Dream for Your Life (2006)
 Embracing God's Design for Your Life: Women of Faith Study Guide Series (2007)
 Get Off Your Knees and Pray (2008)
 Let Go (2009)
 Beautiful Things Happen When a Woman Trusts God (2010)
 Angel Song (2010) Novel
 Good Morning, Lord: I Don't Know Where You're Going Today But I'm Going with You (2010) Devotional
 The Shelter of God's Promises (2011)
 Sweet Sanctuary (2011) Novel
 God's Shelter for Your Storm (2011) Devotional
 God Loves Broken People (2012)
 Song of the Brokenhearted (2012) Novel
 The Storm Inside(2014) 
 Loved Back to Life (2015) Autobiography
 Meet My Best Friend (2015) Children's
 5 Minutes with Jesus (2015) Devotional

Video collections
 A Sparrow Double Play (Sheila Walsh-Mystery & Steve Taylor-Meltdown) 1983
 The Cause: Do Something Now 1985
 Shadowlands: In Concert Live In London 1986
 Fight the Fight: Rescue the Unborn 1986
 Simple Truth Videos 1990
 Handel's Young Messiah (duet with Russ Taff on He Shall Feed His Flock) 1990
 Hymns & Voices 1990
 Pop Volume 4 (Big Boy Now Music Video) 1992
 Sheila Walsh Live: Finding Hope in the Mist of Disappointment 1999
 Live in Concert: An Evening with Sheila Walsh'' 2002

References

External links
 
  Embracing God's Promises for my life. Radio Broadcast:Focus on the Family 

1956 births
Living people
British performers of Christian music
Scottish singer-songwriters
American performers of Christian music
American singer-songwriters
People from Ayr
Scottish Christians
American Christians
British emigrants to the United States
20th-century Scottish women writers
21st-century Scottish women writers
20th-century American women writers
21st-century American women writers
Alumni of the London School of Theology
Scottish Baptists
Southern Baptists
People with acquired American citizenship